Edmilson Rodrigues (born May 26, 1957) is a Brazilian politician who served as mayor of Belém, Federal Deputy and State Deputy for the State of Pará. He is a member of the Socialism and Freedom Party (PSOL), previously having been a member of the Workers' Party (PT).

Political career
From 1997 to 2005, he served as mayor of Belém.

Rodrigues voted against of the impeachment process against then-president Dilma Rousseff.

He returned to municipal politics in the 2020 Brazilian municipal elections, presenting himself once again as a candidate for mayor of Belém. With around 52% of the votes, he was elected to the position.

See also
 List of mayors of Belém

References

External links 
election result

|-

Living people
Mayors of Belém
1957 births
Socialism and Liberty Party politicians
Workers' Party (Brazil) politicians
Members of the Chamber of Deputies (Brazil) from Pará
Members of the Legislative Assembly of Pará